Science in Islam may refer to:

 Islamic science (the history of science in the Islamic World)
 The relation between Islam and science